Rudbar (also Romanized as Rūdbar; also known as Deh-e Rūd Bār, Deh Rūdeh, Roodar’ieyh, and Rūdar) is a village in Rabor Rural District, in the Central District of Rabor County, Kerman Province, Iran(at 29°16'48" north  and 56°57'36"). At the 2006 census, its population was 420, in 106 families.

General Percy Sykes found Greek pottery and coins at Rudbar.

References 

Populated places in Rabor County